Machavariani is a Georgian surname, formerly a noble family from western part of Georgia, Kingdom of Imereti. Originally coming from Svaneti, mountainous region of Georgia, they established themselves in Upper Imereti as a noble family in the regions of Kharagauli, Zestafoni, Chiatura since 1452. Later they spread across Kingdom of Kartli - Shida Kartli and Kvemo Kartli regions. In ancient Georgian feudal hierarchy the Machavariani are mentioned as aznauri or takhtis aznauri of the Georgia royal (tavadi) families - House of Orbeliani, Amirejibi and few others. After Georgia was annexed by the Russian Empire, the Machavariani were confirmed in their nobility title (dvoryanstvo) in 1850.

The following are notable people with this surname:

 Mikhail Sergeevich Machavariani (1888-1969) Russian pilot, Colonel, Commander of a Caucasian Airforce unit during World War I, in 1916 awarded The Order of St. George, highest military decoration in Russian Imperial Army
 David Mikhailovich Machavariani (1886), Colonel, The Commander of the 490th Infantry Rzhevsky Regiment in Russian Imperial Army. Awarded the Order of St. George 4th Class.
 Aleksandr Machavariani (1913–1995), Soviet and Georgian composer and conductor
 Mukhran Machavariani (1929–2010), Soviet and Georgian poet, member of the Supreme Council of the Republic of Georgia in 1990–1992
 Vakhtang Machavariani Georgian, Russian and Soviet conductor and composer
 Mikheil Machavariani (born 1968), Georgian politician, First Deputy Chairman of the Parliament of Georgia 2004-2008, one of the leaders of 'UNM' political party in Georgia
 Vano Machavariani Deputy Secretary General of the Security Council of Georgia, former Georgian President’s Adviser, first Rep. of Georgia Ambassador to Japan
 Gia Machavariani (born 1985) is a Georgian Olympic team weightlifter, Europe and World Championships medalist in the 105 kg events
 Mariam "Marie" Kevkhishvili Machavariani (born 1985), Georgian shot putter
 Mamuka Machavariani (born 1970), Soviet and Georgian football player
 Tsotne Machavariani (born 1997), is a pistol shooter from Georgia, competed in 2016 Summer Olympics in Rio

References

ჟურნალი „თბილისიელები" რუბრიკა „ვისი გორის ხარ" N 15(380), 7–13 აპრილი 2008 წელი

Georgian-language surnames